Porta Pertusa is one of the gates of the Leonine Wall in Rome (Italy).

Description
It is constituted by three openings: two secondary accesses on both sides of the main gate, surrounded by a majestic bossage. Nowadays it is walled up and rises in Viale Vaticano, close to the street of the same name; it is overlooked by the tower of San Giovanni (restored by Pope John XXIII, who resided in it during the last years of his papacy), that is the south-western bastion of the former Leonine Wall.

The age of its construction is quite controversial (the same as Porta Cavalleggeri). It probably dates back to the return of Popes from the Avignon Papacy, that is the end of the 14th century, when the pontiffs, coming back to Rome from Avignon with a large retinue, took up definitively their residence in the Vatican (thus leaving their previous residence in the Lateran) and the three gates of the Leonine Wall turned out to be too few to meet the needs of the resulting population and building increase.
It was created by drilling the former walls (in late Latin pertusus means "drilled") and probably its use was only destined to the Curia and not to the town traffic. Stefano Piale, having observed that there is no mention preceding the one of the humanist Flavio Biondo, thinks that it was erected by Antipope John XXIII, thus dating it at the first quarter of the 15th century. On the other hand, a document dating back to 1279 could make reference to it.

Almost no document refers to the postern placed just a little farther; the only known text calls it Porta Palatii.

The most substantial restoration, also involving the whole western stretch of the wall, was probably carried out by Pope Pius IV in 1565; the Pope died before the completion of the work, though a plaque with the coat of arms of his family, the Medici, has been placed close to the gate.

The gate was probably closed and re-opened several times: just one of these circumstances is known, since a 1655 document reports that it was opened during the visit of Queen Christina of Sweden. During the French siege of Rome in 1849 the French army regarded the Porta Pertusa as a possible way into the city, even though it had been walled up some years previously. The reason for this was that recent French maps incorrectly showed the gate as operational.

Notes

Bibliography 
 Mauro Quercioli, "Le mura e le porte di Roma", Newton Compton, 1982
 Laura G. Cozzi, “Le porte di Roma”, F. Spinosi Ed., Rome, 1968

External links

Pertusa